Barbour's day gecko (Phelsuma barbouri) is a species of lizard in the family Gekkonidae. The species is endemic to central Madagascar. It is diurnal and typically dwells on rocks. Barbour's day gecko feeds on insects and nectar.

Etymology
The specific name, barbouri, as well as the common name, Barbour's day gecko, are in honor of American herpetologist Thomas Barbour.

Description
P. barbouri is a middle-sized day gecko. The body colour is brownish green or dark green. Both a dark brown dorso-lateral stripe and a dark brown lateral stripe extend from head to tail. The extremities are normally brown. The tail is unicoloured green and slightly flattened.

Geographic range

Habitat
In contrast to other lizards of the genus Phelsuma, P. barbouri is terrestrial and typically lives on stones on the ground or on rocks in savanna habitat. The climate of its habitat is extremely harsh. There is a huge difference in temperature between night and day, and between different seasons. At night, it is cool and foggy.

Diet
P. barbouri feeds on various insects and other invertebrates.

Behaviour
P. barbouri often lives in small groups. During the day, it flattens its body to catch as much sun as possible. This way it can reach its preferred body temperature. During the night and in the early morning, P. barbouri has a dark colour. However, when it is basking, the body colour becomes brighter.

Reproduction
Adult females of P. barbouri glue their eggs under stones. Since additional females may deposit their eggs at the same location, as many as 50 eggs may be found together. The neonates measure .

Care and maintenance in captivity
P. barbouri should be housed in pairs and needs a large terrarium which should provide many places to hide. Group breeding, however, is possible. The terrarium should be earth-based with a number of flat rocks present. It is important that there be some spot lights for basking. In captivity, it can be fed crickets, wax moths, fruit flies, mealworms, and houseflies.

References

Further reading
 194 pp. (Phelsuma barbouri, p. 115).
Glaw F, Vences M (2006). A Field Guide to the Amphibians and Reptiles of Madagascar, Third Edition. Cologne, Germany: Vences & Glaw Verlag. 496 pp. .
Henkel F-W, Schmidt W (1995). Amphibien und Reptilien Madagaskars, der Maskarenen, Seychellen und Komoren. Stuttgart: Ulmer. . (in German).
Loveridge A (1942). "Revision of the Afro-Oriental Geckos of the Genus Phelsuma ". Bull. Mus. Comp. Zool. Harvard 89 (10): 438-481. ("Phelsuma barbouri, new species, pp. 439, 458-459).
McKeown, Sean (1993). The General Care and Maintenance of Day Geckos. Lakeside, California: Advanced Vivarium Systems.

barbouri
Reptiles of Madagascar
Endemic fauna of Madagascar
Reptiles described in 1942